The American Revolution was an ideological and political revolution that occurred in British America between 1765 and 1791. The Americans in the Thirteen Colonies formed independent states that defeated the British in the American Revolutionary War (1775–1783), gaining independence from the British Crown and establishing the United States as the first nation-state founded on Enlightenment principles of liberal democracy.

American colonists objected to being taxed by the Parliament of Great Britain, a body in which they had no direct representation. Before the 1760s, Britain's American colonies had enjoyed a high level of autonomy in their internal affairs, which were locally governed by colonial legislatures. During the 1760s, however, the British Parliament passed a number of acts that were intended to bring the American colonies under more direct rule from the British metropole and increasingly intertwine the economies of the colonies with those of Britain. The passage of the Stamp Act of 1765 imposed internal taxes on official documents, newspapers and most things printed in the colonies, which led to colonial protest and the meeting of representatives from several colonies at the Stamp Act Congress. Tensions relaxed with the British repeal of the Stamp Act, but flared again with the passage of the Townshend Acts in 1767. The British government deployed troops to Boston in 1768 to quell unrest, leading to the Boston Massacre in 1770. The British government repealed most of the Townshend duties in 1770, but retained the tax on tea in order to symbolically assert Parliament's right to tax the colonies. The burning of the Gaspee in Rhode Island in 1772, the passage of the Tea Act of 1773 and the resulting Boston Tea Party in December 1773 led to a new escalation in tensions. The British responded by closing Boston Harbor and enacting a series of punitive laws which effectively rescinded Massachusetts Bay Colony's privileges of self-government. The other colonies rallied behind Massachusetts, and twelve of the thirteen colonies sent delegates in late 1774 to form a Continental Congress for the coordination of their resistance to Britain. Opponents of Britain were known as "Patriots" or "Whigs", while colonists who retained their allegiance to the Crown were known as "Loyalists" or "Tories".

Open warfare erupted when British regulars sent to capture a cache of military supplies were confronted by local Patriot militia at Lexington and Concord on April 19, 1775. Patriot militia, joined by the newly formed Continental Army, then put British forces in Boston under siege by land, and they withdrew by sea. Each colony formed a Provincial Congress, which assumed power from the former colonial governments, suppressed Loyalism, and contributed to the Continental Army led by Commander in Chief General George Washington. The Patriots unsuccessfully attempted to invade Quebec and rally sympathetic colonists there during the winter of 1775–1776.

The Continental Congress declared British King George III a tyrant who trampled the colonists' rights as Englishmen, and they pronounced the colonies free and independent states on July 4, 1776. The Patriot leadership professed the political philosophies of liberalism and republicanism to reject rule by monarchy and aristocracy. The Declaration of Independence proclaimed that all men are created equal, though it was not until later centuries that constitutional amendments and federal laws would incrementally grant equal rights to African Americans, Native Americans, poor white men, and women.

The British captured New York City and its strategic harbor in the summer of 1776. The Continental Army captured a British army at the Battle of Saratoga in October 1777, and France then entered the war as an ally of the United States, expanding the war into a global conflict. The British Royal Navy blockaded ports and held New York City for the duration of the war, and other cities for brief periods, but they failed to destroy Washington's forces.  Britain's priorities shifted southward, attempting to hold the Southern states with the anticipated aid of Loyalists that never materialized. British general Charles Cornwallis captured an American army at Charleston, South Carolina in early 1780, but he failed to enlist enough volunteers from Loyalist civilians to take effective control of the territory. Finally, a combined American and French force captured Cornwallis' army at Yorktown in the fall of 1781, effectively ending the war. The Treaty of Paris was signed on September 3, 1783, formally ending the conflict and confirming the new nation's complete separation from the British Empire. The United States took possession of nearly all the territory east of the Mississippi River and south of the Great Lakes, with the British retaining control of northern Canada, and French ally Spain taking back Florida.

Among the significant results of the American victory were American independence and the end of British mercantilism in America, opening up worldwide trade for the United States—including resumption with Britain. Around 60,000 Loyalists migrated to other British territories, particularly to Canada, but the great majority remained in the United States. The Americans soon adopted the United States Constitution, replacing the weak wartime Confederation and establishing a comparatively strong national government structured as a federal republic, which included an elected executive, a national judiciary, and an elected bicameral Congress representing states in the Senate and the population in the House of Representatives. It is the world's first federal democratic republic founded on the consent of the governed. Shortly after, a Bill of Rights was ratified as the first ten amendments, guaranteeing a number of fundamental rights used as justification for the revolution.

Origin

1651–1763: Early seeds

From the start of English colonization of the Americas, the English government pursued a policy of mercantilism, consistent with the economic policies of other European colonial powers of the time. Under this system, they hoped to grow England's economic and political power by restricting imports, promoting exports, regulating commerce, gaining access to new natural resources, and accumulating new precious metals as monetary reserves. Mercantilist policies were a defining feature of several English American colonies from their inception. The original 1606 charter of the Virginia Company regulated trade in what would become the Colony of Virginia. In general, the export of raw materials to foreign lands was banned, imports of foreign goods were discouraged, and cabotage was restricted to English vessels. These regulations were enforced by the Royal Navy.

Following the parliamentarian victory in the English Civil War, the first mercantilist legislation was passed. In 1651, the Rump Parliament passed the first of the Navigation Acts, intended to both improve England's trade ties with its colonies and to address Dutch domination of the trans-Atlantic trade at the time. This led to the outbreak of war with the Netherlands the following year. After the Restoration, the 1651 Act was repealed, but the Cavalier Parliament passed a series of even more restrictive Navigation Acts. Colonial reactions to these policies were mixed. The Acts prohibited exports of tobacco and other raw materials to non-English territories, which prevented many planters from receiving higher prices for their goods. Additionally, merchants were restricted from importing certain goods and materials from other nations, harming profits. These factors led to smuggling among colonial merchants, especially following passage of the Molasses Act. On the other hand, certain merchants and local industries benefitted from the restrictions on foreign competition. The restrictions on foreign-built ships also greatly benefitted the colonial shipbuilding industry, particularly of the New England colonies. Some argue that the economic impact was minimal on the colonists, but the political friction which the acts triggered was more serious, as the merchants most directly affected were also the most politically active.

King Philip's War was fought from 1675 to 1678 between the New England colonies and a handful of indigenous tribes. It was fought without military assistance from England, thereby contributing to the development of a unique American identity separate from that of the British people. The Restoration of King Charles II to the English throne also accelerated this development. New England had strong Puritan heritage and had supported the parliamentarian Commonwealth government that was responsible for the execution of his father, Charles I. Massachusetts did not recognize the legitimacy of Charles II's reign for more than a year after its onset. Charles II thus became determined to bring the New England colonies under a more centralized administration and direct English control in the 1680s. The New England colonists fiercely opposed his efforts, and the Crown nullified their colonial charters in response. Charles' successor James II finalized these efforts in 1686, establishing the consolidated Dominion of New England, which also included the formerly separate colonies of New York and New Jersey. Edmund Andros was appointed royal governor, and tasked with governing the new Dominion under his direct rule. Colonial assemblies and town meetings were restricted, new taxes were levied, and rights were abridged. Dominion rule triggered bitter resentment throughout New England; the enforcement of the unpopular Navigation Acts and the curtailing of local democracy greatly angered the colonists. New Englanders were encouraged, however, by a change of government in England which saw James II effectively abdicate, and a populist uprising in New England overthrew Dominion rule on April 18, 1689. Colonial governments reasserted their control after the revolt. The new monarchs, William and Mary, granted new charters to the individual New England colonies, and democratic self government was restored. Successive Crown governments made no attempts to restore the Dominion.

Subsequent British governments continued in their efforts to tax certain goods however, passing acts regulating the trade of wool, hats, and molasses. The Molasses Act of 1733 was particularly egregious to the colonists, as a significant part of colonial trade relied on molasses. The taxes severely damaged the New England economy and resulted in a surge of smuggling, bribery, and intimidation of customs officials. Colonial wars fought in America were also a source of considerable tension. For example, New England colonial forces captured the fortress of Louisbourg in Acadia during King George's War in 1745, but the British government then ceded it back to France in 1748 in exchange for Chennai, which the British had lost in 1746. New England colonists resented their losses of lives, as well as the effort and expenditure involved in subduing the fortress, only to have it returned to their erstwhile enemy, who would remain a threat to them after the war.

Some writers begin their histories of the American Revolution with the British coalition victory in the Seven Years' War in 1763, viewing the French and Indian War as though it were the American theater of the Seven Years' War. Lawrence Henry Gipson writes:

The Royal Proclamation of 1763 redrew boundaries of the lands west of newly-British Quebec and west of a line running along the crest of the Allegheny Mountains, making them indigenous territory and barred to colonial settlement for two years. The colonists protested, and the boundary line was adjusted in a series of treaties with indigenous tribes. In 1768, the Iroquois agreed to the Treaty of Fort Stanwix, and the Cherokee agreed to the Treaty of Hard Labour followed in 1770 by the Treaty of Lochaber. The treaties opened most of what is present-day Kentucky and West Virginia to colonial settlement. The new map was drawn up at the Treaty of Fort Stanwix in 1768, which moved the line much farther to the west, from the green line to the red line on the map at right.

1764–1766: Taxes imposed and withdrawn

In 1764 Parliament passed the Sugar Act, decreasing the existing customs duties on sugar and molasses but providing stricter measures of enforcement and collection. That same year, Prime Minister George Grenville proposed direct taxes on the colonies to raise revenue, but he delayed action to see whether the colonies would propose some way to raise the revenue themselves.

Grenville had asserted in 1762 that the whole revenue of the custom houses in America amounted to one or two thousand pounds sterling a year, and that the English exchequer was paying between seven and eight thousand pounds a year to collect. Adam Smith wrote in The Wealth of Nations that Parliament "has never hitherto demanded of [the American colonies] anything which even approached to a just proportion to what was paid by their fellow subjects at home." Benjamin Franklin would later testify in Parliament in 1766 to the contrary, reporting that Americans already contributed heavily to the defense of the Empire. He argued that local colonial governments had raised, outfitted, and paid 25,000 soldiers to fight France in just the French and Indian War alone—as many as Britain itself sent—and spent many millions from American treasuries doing so.

Parliament finally passed the Stamp Act in March 1765, which imposed direct taxes on the colonies for the first time. All official documents, newspapers, almanacs, and pamphlets were required to have the stamps—even decks of playing cards. The colonists did not object that the taxes were high; they were actually low. They objected to their lack of representation in the Parliament, which gave them no voice concerning legislation that affected them. The British were, however, reacting to an entirely different issue: at the conclusion of the recent war the Crown had to deal with approximately 1,500 politically well-connected British Army officers. The decision was made to keep them on active duty with full pay, but they—and their commands—also had to be stationed somewhere. Stationing a standing army in Great Britain during peacetime was politically unacceptable, so they determined to station them in America and have the Americans pay them through the new tax. The soldiers had no military mission however; they were not there to defend the colonies because there was no current threat to the colonies.

The Sons of Liberty formed shortly after the Act in 1765, and they used public demonstrations, boycotts, and threats of violence to ensure that the British tax laws were unenforceable. In Boston, the Sons of Liberty burned the records of the vice admiralty court and looted the home of chief justice Thomas Hutchinson. Several legislatures called for united action, and nine colonies sent delegates to the Stamp Act Congress in New York City in October. Moderates led by John Dickinson drew up a Declaration of Rights and Grievances stating that taxes passed without representation violated their rights as Englishmen, and colonists emphasized their determination by boycotting imports of British merchandise.

The Parliament at Westminster saw itself as the supreme lawmaking authority throughout the Empire and thus entitled to levy any tax without colonial approval or even consultation. They argued that the colonies were legally British corporations subordinate to the British Parliament, and they pointed to numerous instances where Parliament had made laws in the past that were binding on the colonies. Parliament insisted that the colonists effectively enjoyed a "virtual representation", as most British people did, since only a small minority of the British population elected representatives to Parliament. However, Americans such as James Otis maintained that there was no one in Parliament responsible specifically for any colonial constituency, so they were not "virtually represented" by anyone in Parliament at all.

The Rockingham government came to power in July 1765, and Parliament debated whether to repeal the stamp tax or to send an army to enforce it. Benjamin Franklin made the case for repeal, explaining that the colonies had spent heavily in manpower, money, and blood defending the empire in a series of wars against the French and indigenous people, and that further taxes to pay for those wars were unjust and might bring about a rebellion. Parliament agreed and repealed the tax on February 21, 1766, but they insisted in the Declaratory Act of March 1766 that they retained full power to make laws for the colonies "in all cases whatsoever". The repeal nonetheless caused widespread celebrations in the colonies.

1767–1773: Townshend Acts and the Tea Act

In 1767, the Parliament passed the Townshend Acts which placed duties on a number of staple goods, including paper, glass, and tea, and established a Board of Customs in Boston to more rigorously execute trade regulations. The new taxes were enacted on the belief that Americans only objected to internal taxes and not to external taxes such as custom duties. However, in his widely read pamphlet, Letters from a Farmer in Pennsylvania, John Dickinson argued against the constitutionality of the acts because their purpose was to raise revenue and not to regulate trade. Colonists responded to the taxes by organizing new boycotts of British goods. These boycotts were less effective, however, as the goods taxed by the Townshend Acts were widely used.

In February 1768, the Assembly of Massachusetts Bay issued a circular letter to the other colonies urging them to coordinate resistance. The governor dissolved the assembly when it refused to rescind the letter. Meanwhile, a riot broke out in Boston in June 1768 over the seizure of the sloop Liberty, owned by John Hancock, for alleged smuggling. Customs officials were forced to flee, prompting the British to deploy troops to Boston. A Boston town meeting declared that no obedience was due to parliamentary laws and called for the convening of a convention. A convention assembled but only issued a mild protest before dissolving itself. In January 1769, Parliament responded to the unrest by reactivating the Treason Act 1543 which called for subjects outside the realm to face trials for treason in England. The governor of Massachusetts was instructed to collect evidence of said treason, and the threat caused widespread outrage, though it was not carried out.

On March 5, 1770, a large crowd gathered around a group of British soldiers on a Boston street. The crowd grew threatening, throwing snowballs, rocks, and debris at them. One soldier was clubbed and fell. There was no order to fire, but the soldiers panicked and fired into the crowd. They hit 11 people; three civilians died of wounds at the scene of the shooting, and two died shortly after the incident. The event quickly came to be called the Boston Massacre. The soldiers were tried and acquitted (defended by John Adams), but the widespread descriptions soon began to turn colonial sentiment against the British. This accelerated the downward spiral in the relationship between Britain and the Province of Massachusetts.

A new ministry under Lord North came to power in 1770, and Parliament withdrew all taxes except the tax on tea, giving up its efforts to raise revenue while maintaining the right to tax. This temporarily resolved the crisis, and the boycott of British goods largely ceased, with only the more radical patriots such as Samuel Adams continuing to agitate.

In June 1772, American patriots, including John Brown, burned a British warship that had been vigorously enforcing unpopular trade regulations, in what became known as the Gaspee Affair. The affair was investigated for possible treason, but no action was taken.

In 1772, it became known that the Crown intended to pay fixed salaries to the governors and judges in Massachusetts, which had been paid by local authorities. This would reduce the influence of colonial representatives over their government. Samuel Adams in Boston set about creating new Committees of Correspondence, which linked Patriots in all 13 colonies and eventually provided the framework for a rebel government. Virginia, the largest colony, set up its Committee of Correspondence in early 1773, on which Patrick Henry and Thomas Jefferson served.

A total of about 7,000 to 8,000 Patriots served on Committees of Correspondence at the colonial and local levels, comprising most of the leadership in their communities. Loyalists were excluded. The committees became the leaders of the American resistance to British actions, and later largely determined the war effort at the state and local level. When the First Continental Congress decided to boycott British products, the colonial and local Committees took charge, examining merchant records and publishing the names of merchants who attempted to defy the boycott by importing British goods.

In 1773, private letters were published in which Massachusetts Governor Thomas Hutchinson claimed that the colonists could not enjoy all English liberties, and in which Lieutenant Governor Andrew Oliver called for the direct payment of colonial officials. The letters' contents were used as evidence of a systematic plot against American rights, and discredited Hutchinson in the eyes of the people; the colonial Assembly petitioned for his recall. Benjamin Franklin, postmaster general for the colonies, acknowledged that he leaked the letters, which led to him being berated by British officials and removed from his position.

Meanwhile, Parliament passed the Tea Act lowering the price of taxed tea exported to the colonies, to help the British East India Company undersell smuggled untaxed Dutch tea. Special consignees were appointed to sell the tea to bypass colonial merchants. The act was opposed by those who resisted the taxes and also by smugglers who stood to lose business. In most instances, the consignees were forced by the Americans to resign and the tea was turned back, but Massachusetts governor Hutchinson refused to allow Boston merchants to give in to pressure. A town meeting in Boston determined that the tea would not be landed, and ignored a demand from the governor to disperse. On December 16, 1773, a group of men, led by Samuel Adams and dressed to evoke the appearance of indigenous people, boarded the ships of the East India Company and dumped £10,000 worth of tea from their holds (approximately £636,000 in 2008) into Boston Harbor. Decades later, this event became known as the Boston Tea Party and remains a significant part of American patriotic lore.

1774–1775: Intolerable Acts

The British government responded by passing several measures that came to be known as the Intolerable Acts, further darkening colonial opinion towards England. They consisted of four laws enacted by the British parliament. The first was the Massachusetts Government Act which altered the Massachusetts charter and restricted town meetings. The second act was the Administration of Justice Act which ordered that all British soldiers to be tried were to be arraigned in Britain, not in the colonies. The third Act was the Boston Port Act, which closed the port of Boston until the British had been compensated for the tea lost in the Boston Tea Party. The fourth Act was the Quartering Act of 1774, which allowed royal governors to house British troops in the homes of citizens without requiring permission of the owner.

In response, Massachusetts patriots issued the Suffolk Resolves and formed an alternative shadow government known as the Provincial Congress which began training militia outside British-occupied Boston. In September 1774, the First Continental Congress convened, consisting of representatives from each colony, to serve as a vehicle for deliberation and collective action. During secret debates, conservative Joseph Galloway proposed the creation of a colonial Parliament that would be able to approve or disapprove acts of the British Parliament, but his idea was tabled in a vote of 6 to 5 and was subsequently removed from the record. Congress called for a boycott beginning on December 1, 1774, of all British goods; it was enforced by new local committees authorized by the Congress.

Military hostilities begin

Massachusetts was declared in a state of rebellion in February 1775 and the British garrison received orders to disarm the rebels and arrest their leaders, leading to the Battles of Lexington and Concord on April 19, 1775. The Patriots laid siege to Boston, expelled royal officials from all the colonies, and took control through the establishment of Provincial Congresses. The Battle of Bunker Hill followed on June 17, 1775. It was a British victory—but at a great cost: about 1,000 British casualties from a garrison of about 6,000, as compared to 500 American casualties from a much larger force. The Second Continental Congress was divided on the best course of action, but eventually produced the Olive Branch Petition, in which they attempted to come to an accord with King George. The king, however, issued a Proclamation of Rebellion which declared that the states were "in rebellion" and the members of Congress were traitors.

The war that arose was in some ways a classic insurgency. As Benjamin Franklin wrote to Joseph Priestley in October 1775: 

In the winter of 1775, the Americans invaded newly-British Quebec under generals Benedict Arnold and Richard Montgomery, expecting to rally sympathetic colonists there. The attack was a failure; many Americans who weren't killed were either captured or died of smallpox.

In March 1776, the Continental Army forced the British to evacuate Boston, with George Washington as the commander of the new army. The revolutionaries now fully controlled all thirteen colonies and were ready to declare independence. There still were many Loyalists, but they were no longer in control anywhere by July 1776, and all of the Royal officials had fled.

Creating new state constitutions

Following the Battle of Bunker Hill in June 1775, the Patriots had control of Massachusetts outside the Boston city limits, and the Loyalists suddenly found themselves on the defensive with no protection from the British army. In all 13 colonies, Patriots had overthrown their existing governments, closing courts and driving away British officials. They held elected conventions and "legislatures" that existed outside any legal framework; new constitutions were drawn up in each state to supersede royal charters. They proclaimed that they were now states, no longer colonies.

On January 5, 1776, New Hampshire ratified the first state constitution. In May 1776, Congress voted to suppress all forms of crown authority, to be replaced by locally created authority. Virginia, South Carolina, and New Jersey created their constitutions before July 4. Rhode Island and Connecticut simply took their existing royal charters and deleted all references to the crown. The new states were all committed to republicanism, with no inherited offices. They decided what form of government to create, and also how to select those who would craft the constitutions and how the resulting document would be ratified. On May 26, 1776, John Adams wrote James Sullivan from Philadelphia warning against extending the franchise too far:

The resulting constitutions in states such as Maryland, Virginia, Delaware, New York, and Massachusetts featured:
 Property qualifications for voting and even more substantial requirements for elected positions (though New York and Maryland lowered property qualifications)
 Bicameral legislatures, with the upper house as a check on the lower
 Strong governors with veto power over the legislature and substantial appointment authority
 Few or no restraints on individuals holding multiple positions in government
 The continuation of state-established religion

In Pennsylvania, New Jersey, and New Hampshire, the resulting constitutions embodied:
 universal manhood suffrage, or minimal property requirements for voting or holding office (New Jersey enfranchised some property-owning widows, a step that it retracted 25 years later)
 strong, unicameral legislatures
 relatively weak governors without veto powers, and with little appointing authority
 prohibition against individuals holding multiple government posts

The radical provisions of Pennsylvania's constitution lasted only 14 years. In 1790, conservatives gained power in the state legislature, called a new constitutional convention, and rewrote the constitution. The new constitution substantially reduced universal male suffrage, gave the governor veto power and patronage appointment authority, and added an upper house with substantial wealth qualifications to the unicameral legislature. Thomas Paine called it a constitution unworthy of America.

Independence and Union

In April 1776, the North Carolina Provincial Congress issued the Halifax Resolves explicitly authorizing its delegates to vote for independence. By June, nine Provincial Congresses were ready for independence; one by one, the last four fell into line: Pennsylvania, Delaware, Maryland, and New York. Richard Henry Lee was instructed by the Virginia legislature to propose independence, and he did so on June 7, 1776. On June 11, a committee was created by the Second Continental Congress to draft a document explaining the justifications for separation from Britain. After securing enough votes for passage, independence was voted for on July 2.

The Declaration of Independence was drafted largely by Thomas Jefferson and presented by the committee; it was unanimously adopted by the entire Congress on July 4, and each colony became an independent and autonomous state. The next step was to form a union to facilitate international relations and alliances.

The Second Continental Congress approved the Articles of Confederation and Perpetual Union for ratification by the states on November 15, 1777; the Congress immediately began operating under the Articles' terms, providing a structure of shared sovereignty during prosecution of the war and facilitating international relations and alliances with France and Spain. The Articles were fully ratified on March 1, 1781. At that point, the Continental Congress was dissolved and a new government of the United States in Congress Assembled took its place on the following day, with Samuel Huntington as presiding officer.

Defending the Revolution

British return: 1776–1777

According to British historian Jeremy Black, the British had significant advantages, including a highly trained army, the world's largest navy, and an efficient system of public finance that could easily fund the war. However, they seriously misunderstood the depth of support for the American Patriot position and ignored the advice of General Gage, misinterpreting the situation as merely a large-scale riot. The British government believed that they could overawe the Americans by sending a large military and naval force, forcing them to be loyal again:

Washington forced the British out of Boston in the spring of 1776, and neither the British nor the Loyalists controlled any significant areas. The British, however, were massing forces at their naval base at Halifax, Nova Scotia. They returned in force in July 1776, landing in New York and defeating Washington's Continental Army in August at the Battle of Brooklyn. Following that victory, they requested a meeting with representatives from Congress to negotiate an end to hostilities.

A delegation including John Adams and Benjamin Franklin met British admiral Richard Howe on Staten Island in New York Harbor on September 11 in what became known as the Staten Island Peace Conference. Howe demanded that the Americans retract the Declaration of Independence, which they refused to do, and negotiations ended. The British then seized New York City and nearly captured Washington's army. They made the city and its strategic harbor their main political and military base of operations, holding it until November 1783. The city became the destination for Loyalist refugees and a focal point of Washington's intelligence network.

The British also took New Jersey, pushing the Continental Army into Pennsylvania. Washington crossed the Delaware River back into New Jersey in a surprise attack in late December 1776 and defeated the Hessian and British armies at Trenton and Princeton, thereby regaining control of most of New Jersey. The victories gave an important boost to Patriots at a time when morale was flagging, and they have become iconic events of the war.

In 1777, the British sent Burgoyne's invasion force from Canada south to New York to seal off New England. Their aim was to isolate New England, which the British perceived as the primary source of agitation. Rather than move north to support Burgoyne, the British army in New York City went to Philadelphia in a major case of mis-coordination, capturing it from Washington. The invasion army under Burgoyne was much too slow and became trapped in northern New York state. It surrendered after the Battles of Saratoga in October 1777. From early October 1777 until November 15, a siege distracted British troops at Fort Mifflin, Philadelphia, Pennsylvania, and allowed Washington time to preserve the Continental Army by safely leading his troops to harsh winter quarters at Valley Forge.

Prisoners

On August 23, 1775, George III declared Americans to be traitors to the Crown if they took up arms against royal authority. There were thousands of British and Hessian soldiers in American hands following their surrender at the Battles of Saratoga. Lord Germain took a hard line, but the British generals on American soil never held treason trials, and instead treated captured American soldiers as prisoners of war. The dilemma was that tens of thousands of Loyalists were under American control and American retaliation would have been easy. The British built much of their strategy around using these Loyalists. The British maltreated the prisoners whom they held, resulting in more deaths to American prisoners of war than from combat operations. At the end of the war, both sides released their surviving prisoners.

American alliances after 1778

The capture of a British army at Saratoga encouraged the French to formally enter the war in support of Congress, and Benjamin Franklin negotiated a permanent military alliance in early 1778; France thus became the first foreign nation to officially recognize the Declaration of Independence. On February 6, 1778, the United States and France signed the Treaty of Amity and Commerce and the Treaty of Alliance. William Pitt spoke out in Parliament urging Britain to make peace in America and to unite with America against France, while British politicians who had sympathized with colonial grievances now turned against the Americans for allying with Britain's rival and enemy.

The Spanish and the Dutch became allies of the French in 1779 and 1780 respectively, forcing the British to fight a global war without major allies, and requiring it to slip through a combined blockade of the Atlantic. Britain began to view the American war for independence as merely one front in a wider war, and the British chose to withdraw troops from America to reinforce the British colonies in the Caribbean, which were under threat of Spanish or French invasion. British commander Sir Henry Clinton evacuated Philadelphia and returned to New York City. General Washington intercepted him in the Battle of Monmouth Court House, the last major battle fought in the north. After an inconclusive engagement, the British retreated to New York City. The northern war subsequently became a stalemate, as the focus of attention shifted to the smaller southern theater.

The British move South: 1778–1783

The British strategy in America now concentrated on a campaign in the southern states. With fewer regular troops at their disposal, the British commanders saw the "southern strategy" as a more viable plan, as they perceived the south as strongly Loyalist with a large population of recent immigrants and large numbers of slaves who might be tempted to run away from their masters to join the British and gain their freedom.

Beginning in late December 1778, the British captured Savannah and controlled the Georgia coastline. In 1780, they launched a fresh invasion and took Charleston, as well. A significant victory at the Battle of Camden meant that royal forces soon controlled most of Georgia and South Carolina. The British set up a network of forts inland, hoping that the Loyalists would rally to the flag. Not enough Loyalists turned out, however, and the British had to fight their way north into North Carolina and Virginia with a severely weakened army. Behind them, much of the territory that they had already captured dissolved into a chaotic guerrilla war, fought predominantly between bands of Loyalists and American militia, and which negated many of the gains that the British had previously made.

Surrender at Yorktown (1781)

The British army under Cornwallis marched to Yorktown, Virginia, where they expected to be rescued by a British fleet. The fleet did arrive, but so did a larger French fleet. The French were victorious in the Battle of the Chesapeake, and the British fleet returned to New York for reinforcements, leaving Cornwallis trapped. In October 1781, the British surrendered their second invading army of the war under a siege by the combined French and Continental armies commanded by Washington.

The end of the war

Washington did not know if or when the British might reopen hostilities after Yorktown. They still had 26,000 troops occupying New York City, Charleston, and Savannah, together with a powerful fleet. The French army and navy departed, so the Americans were on their own in 1782–83. The American treasury was empty, and the unpaid soldiers were growing restive, almost to the point of mutiny or possible coup d'etat. Washington dispelled the unrest among officers of the Newburgh Conspiracy in 1783, and Congress subsequently created the promise of a five years bonus for all officers.

Historians continue to debate whether the odds were long or short for American victory. John E. Ferling says that the odds were so long that the American victory was "almost a miracle". On the other hand, Joseph Ellis says that the odds favored the Americans, and asks whether there ever was any realistic chance for the British to win. He argues that this opportunity came only once, in the summer of 1776, and the British failed that test. Admiral Howe and his brother General Howe "missed several opportunities to destroy the Continental Army .... Chance, luck, and even the vagaries of the weather played crucial roles." Ellis's point is that the strategic and tactical decisions of the Howes were fatally flawed because they underestimated the challenges posed by the Patriots. Ellis concludes that, once the Howe brothers failed, the opportunity "would never come again" for a British victory.

Support for the conflict had never been strong in Britain, where many sympathized with the Americans, but now it reached a new low. King George wanted to fight on, but his supporters lost control of Parliament and they launched no further offensives in America on the eastern seaboard. However, the British continued formal and informal assistance to Indian tribes making war on US citizens over the next three decades, which contributed to a "Second American Revolution" in the War of 1812. In that war against Britain, the US permanently established its territory and its citizenship independent of the British Empire.

Paris peace treaty

During negotiations in Paris, the American delegation discovered that France supported American independence but no territorial gains, hoping to confine the new nation to the area east of the Appalachian Mountains. The Americans opened direct secret negotiations with London, cutting out the French. British Prime Minister Lord Shelburne was in charge of the British negotiations, and he saw a chance to make the United States a valuable economic partner. The US obtained all the land east of the Mississippi River, including southern Canada, but Spain took control of Florida from the British. It gained fishing rights off Canadian coasts, and agreed to allow British merchants and Loyalists to recover their property. Prime Minister Shelburne foresaw highly profitable two-way trade between Britain and the rapidly growing United States, which did come to pass. The blockade was lifted and all British interference had been driven out, and American merchants were free to trade with any nation anywhere in the world.

The British largely abandoned their indigenous allies, who were not a party to this treaty and did not recognize it until they were defeated militarily by the United States. However, the British did sell them munitions and maintain forts in American territory until the Jay Treaty of 1795.

Losing the war and the Thirteen Colonies was a shock to Britain. The war revealed the limitations of Britain's fiscal-military state when they discovered that they suddenly faced powerful enemies with no allies, and they were dependent on extended and vulnerable transatlantic lines of communication. The defeat heightened dissension and escalated political antagonism to the King's ministers.  The King went so far as to draft letters of abdication, although they were never delivered.  Inside Parliament, the primary concern changed from fears of an over-mighty monarch to the issues of representation, parliamentary reform, and government retrenchment. Reformers sought to destroy what they saw as widespread institutional corruption, and the result was a crisis from 1776 to 1783. The crisis ended after 1784 confidence in the British constitution was restored during the administration of Prime Minister William Pitt.

Finance

Britain's war against the Americans, the French, and the Spanish cost about £100 million, and the Treasury borrowed 40 percent of the money that it needed. Heavy spending brought France to the verge of bankruptcy and revolution, while the British had relatively little difficulty financing their war, keeping their suppliers and soldiers paid, and hiring tens of thousands of German soldiers. Britain had a sophisticated financial system based on the wealth of thousands of landowners who supported the government, together with banks and financiers in London. The British tax system collected about 12 percent of the GDP in taxes during the 1770s.

In sharp contrast, Congress and the American states had no end of difficulty financing the war. In 1775, there was at most 12 million dollars in gold in the colonies, not nearly enough to cover current transactions, let alone finance a major war. The British made the situation much worse by imposing a tight blockade on every American port, which cut off almost all imports and exports. One partial solution was to rely on volunteer support from militiamen and donations from patriotic citizens. Another was to delay actual payments, pay soldiers and suppliers in depreciated currency, and promise that it would be made good after the war. Indeed, the soldiers and officers were given land grants in 1783 to cover the wages that they had earned but had not been paid during the war. The national government did not have a strong leader in financial matters until 1781, when Robert Morris was named Superintendent of Finance of the United States. Morris used a French loan in 1782 to set up the private Bank of North America to finance the war. He reduced the civil list, saved money by using competitive bidding for contracts, tightened accounting procedures, and demanded the national government's full share of money and supplies from the individual states.

Congress used four main methods to cover the cost of the war, which cost about 66 million dollars in specie (gold and silver). Congress made issues of paper money, known colloquially as "Continental Dollars", in 1775–1780 and in 1780–1781. The first issue amounted to 242 million dollars. This paper money would supposedly be redeemed for state taxes, but the holders were eventually paid off in 1791 at the rate of one cent on the dollar. By 1780, the paper money was so devalued that the phrase "not worth a Continental" became synonymous with worthlessness. The skyrocketing inflation was a hardship on the few people who had fixed incomes, but 90 percent of the people were farmers and were not directly affected by it. Debtors benefited by paying off their debts with depreciated paper. The greatest burden was borne by the soldiers of the Continental Army whose wages were usually paid late and declined in value every month, weakening their morale and adding to the hardships of their families.

Beginning in 1777, Congress repeatedly asked the states to provide money, but the states had no system of taxation and were of little help. By 1780, Congress was making requisitions for specific supplies of corn, beef, pork, and other necessities, an inefficient system which barely kept the army alive. Starting in 1776, the Congress sought to raise money by loans from wealthy individuals, promising to redeem the bonds after the war. The bonds were redeemed in 1791 at face value, but the scheme raised little money because Americans had little specie, and many of the rich merchants were supporters of the Crown. The French secretly supplied the Americans with money, gunpowder, and munitions to weaken Great Britain; the subsidies continued when France entered the war in 1778, and the French government and Paris bankers lent large sums to the American war effort. The Americans struggled to pay off the loans; they ceased making interest payments to France in 1785 and defaulted on installments due in 1787. In 1790, however, they resumed regular payments on their debts to the French, and settled their accounts with the French government in 1795 when James Swan, an American banker, assumed responsibility for the balance of the debt in exchange for the right to refinance it at a profit.

Concluding the Revolution

Creating a "more perfect union" and guaranteeing rights
The war ended in 1783 and was followed by a period of prosperity. The national government was still operating under the Articles of Confederation and settled the issue of the western territories, which the states ceded to Congress. American settlers moved rapidly into those areas, with Vermont, Kentucky, and Tennessee becoming states in the 1790s.

However, the national government had no money either to pay the war debts owed to European nations and the private banks, or to pay Americans who had been given millions of dollars of promissory notes for supplies during the war. Nationalists led by Washington, Alexander Hamilton, and other veterans feared that the new nation was too fragile to withstand an international war, or even the repetition of internal revolts such as the Shays' Rebellion of 1786 in Massachusetts. They convinced Congress to call the Philadelphia Convention in 1787. The Convention adopted a new Constitution which provided for a republic with a much stronger national government in a federal framework, including an effective executive in a check-and-balance system with the judiciary and legislature. The Constitution was ratified in 1788, after a fierce debate in the states over the proposed new government. The new administration under President George Washington took office in New York in March 1789. James Madison spearheaded Congressional amendments to the Constitution as assurances to those cautious about federal power, guaranteeing many of the inalienable rights that formed a foundation for the revolution. Rhode Island was the final state to ratify the Constitution in 1790, the first ten amendments were ratified in 1791 and became known as the United States Bill of Rights.

National debt

The national debt fell into three categories after the American Revolution. The first was the $12 million owed to foreigners, mostly money borrowed from France. There was general agreement to pay the foreign debts at full value. The national government owed $40 million and state governments owed $25 million to Americans who had sold food, horses, and supplies to the Patriot forces. There were also other debts which consisted of promissory notes issued during the war to soldiers, merchants, and farmers who accepted these payments on the premise that the new Constitution would create a government that would pay these debts eventually.

The war expenses of the individual states added up to $114 million, compared to $37 million by the central government. In 1790, Congress combined the remaining state debts with the foreign and domestic debts into one national debt totaling $80 million at the recommendation of first Secretary of the Treasury Alexander Hamilton. Everyone received face value for wartime certificates, so that the national honor would be sustained and the national credit established.

Ideology and factions
The population of the Thirteen States was not homogeneous in political views and attitudes. Loyalties and allegiances varied widely within regions and communities and even within families, and sometimes shifted during the Revolution.

Ideology behind the Revolution

The American Enlightenment was a critical precursor of the American Revolution. Chief among the ideas of the American Enlightenment were the concepts of natural law, natural rights, consent of the governed, individualism, property rights, self-ownership, self-determination, liberalism, republicanism, and defense against corruption. A growing number of American colonists embraced these views and fostered an intellectual environment which led to a new sense of political and social identity.

Liberalism

John Locke (1632–1704) is often referred to as "the philosopher of the American Revolution" due to his work in the Social Contract and Natural Rights theories that underpinned the Revolution's political ideology. Locke's Two Treatises of Government published in 1689 was especially influential. He argued that all humans were created equally free, and governments therefore needed the "consent of the governed". In late eighteenth-century America, belief was still widespread in "equality by creation" and "rights by creation". Locke's ideas on liberty influenced the political thinking of English writers such as John Trenchard, Thomas Gordon, and Benjamin Hoadly, whose political ideas in turn also had a strong influence on the American Patriots.

The theory of the social contract influenced the belief among many of the Founders that the right of the people to overthrow their leaders, should those leaders betray the historic rights of Englishmen, was one of the "natural rights" of man. The Americans heavily relied on Montesquieu's analysis of the wisdom of the "balanced" British Constitution (mixed government) in writing the state and national constitutions.

Republicanism

The most basic features of republicanism anywhere are a representational government in which citizens elect leaders from among themselves for a predefined term, as opposed to a permanent ruling class or aristocracy, and laws are passed by these leaders for the benefit of the entire republic. In addition, unlike a direct or "pure" democracy in which the majority vote rules, a republic codifies in a charter or constitution a certain set of basic civil rights that is guaranteed to every citizen and cannot be overridden by majority rule.

The American interpretation of "republicanism" was inspired by the Whig party in Great Britain which openly criticized the corruption within the British government. Americans were increasingly embracing republican values, seeing Britain as corrupt and hostile to American interests. The colonists associated political corruption with ostentatious luxury and inherited aristocracy, which they condemned.

The Founding Fathers were strong advocates of republican values, particularly Samuel Adams, Patrick Henry, John Adams, Benjamin Franklin, Thomas Jefferson, Thomas Paine, George Washington, James Madison, and Alexander Hamilton, which required men to put civic duty ahead of their personal desires. Men were honor bound by civic obligation to be prepared and willing to fight for the rights and liberties of their countrymen. John Adams wrote to Mercy Otis Warren in 1776, agreeing with some classical Greek and Roman thinkers: "Public Virtue cannot exist without private, and public Virtue is the only Foundation of Republics." He continued:

"Republican motherhood" became the ideal for American women, exemplified by Abigail Adams and Mercy Otis Warren; the first duty of the republican woman was to instill republican values in her children and to avoid luxury and ostentation.

Protestant Dissenters and the Great Awakening

Protestant churches that had separated from the Church of England (called "dissenters") were the "school of democracy", in the words of historian Patricia Bonomi. Before the Revolution, the Southern Colonies and three of the New England Colonies had official established churches: Congregational in Massachusetts Bay, Connecticut, and New Hampshire, and the Church of England in Maryland, Virginia, North-Carolina, South Carolina, and Georgia. The New York, New Jersey, Pennsylvania, Delaware, and the Colony of Rhode Island and Providence Plantations had no officially established churches. Church membership statistics from the period are unreliable and scarce, but what little data exists indicates that the Church of England was not in the majority, not even in the colonies where the it was the established church, and they probably did not comprise even 30 percent of the population in most localities (with the possible exception of Virginia).

President John Witherspoon of the College of New Jersey (now Princeton University), a "new light" Presbyterian, wrote widely circulated sermons linking the American Revolution to the teachings of the Bible. Throughout the colonies, dissenting Protestant ministers (Congregational, Baptist, and Presbyterian) preached Revolutionary themes in their sermons, while most Church of England clergymen preached loyalty to the king, the titular head of the English state church. Religious motivation for fighting tyranny transcended socioeconomic lines to encompass rich and poor, men and women, frontierspeople and townspeople, farmers and merchants. The Declaration of Independence also referred to the "Laws of Nature and of Nature's God" as justification for the Americans' separation from the British monarchy. Most eighteenth-century Americans believed that the entire universe ("nature") was God's creation and he was "Nature's God". Everything was part of the "universal order of things" which began with God and was directed by his providence. Accordingly, the signers of the Declaration professed their "firm reliance on the Protection of divine Providence", and they appealed to "the Supreme Judge for the rectitude of our intentions". George Washington was firmly convinced that he was an instrument of providence, to the benefit of the American people and of all humanity.

Historian Bernard Bailyn argues that the evangelicalism of the era challenged traditional notions of natural hierarchy by preaching that the Bible teaches that all men are equal, so that the true value of a man lies in his moral behavior, not in his class. Kidd argues that religious disestablishment, belief in God as the source of human rights, and shared convictions about sin, virtue, and divine providence worked together to unite rationalists and evangelicals and thus encouraged a large proportion of Americans to fight for independence from the Empire. Bailyn, on the other hand, denies that religion played such a critical role. Alan Heimert argues that New Light anti-authoritarianism was essential to furthering democracy in colonial American society, and set the stage for a confrontation with British monarchical and aristocratic rule.

Class and psychology of the factions

John Adams concluded in 1818:

In the mid-20th century, historian Leonard Woods Labaree identified eight characteristics of the Loyalists that made them essentially conservative, opposite to the characteristics of the Patriots. Loyalists tended to feel that resistance to the Crown was morally wrong, while the Patriots thought that morality was on their side. Loyalists were alienated when the Patriots resorted to violence, such as burning houses and tarring and feathering. Loyalists wanted to take a centrist position and resisted the Patriots' demand to declare their opposition to the Crown. Many Loyalists had maintained strong and long-standing relations with Britain, especially merchants in port cities such as New York and Boston. Many Loyalists felt that independence was bound to come eventually, but they were fearful that revolution might lead to anarchy, tyranny, or mob rule. In contrast, the prevailing attitude among Patriots was a desire to seize the initiative. Labaree also wrote that Loyalists were pessimists who lacked the confidence in the future displayed by the Patriots.

Historians in the early 20th century such as J. Franklin Jameson examined the class composition of the Patriot cause, looking for evidence of a class war inside the revolution. More recent historians have largely abandoned that interpretation, emphasizing instead the high level of ideological unity. Both Loyalists and Patriots were a "mixed lot", but ideological demands always came first. The Patriots viewed independence as a means to gain freedom from British oppression and to reassert their basic rights. Most yeomen farmers, craftsmen, and small merchants joined the Patriot cause to demand more political equality. They were especially successful in Pennsylvania but less so in New England, where John Adams attacked Thomas Paine's Common Sense for the "absurd democratical notions" that it proposed.

King George III

The revolution became a personal issue for the king, fueled by his growing belief that British leniency would be taken as weakness by the Americans. He also sincerely believed that he was defending Britain's constitution against usurpers, rather than opposing patriots fighting for their natural rights.

Although Prime Minister Lord North was not an ideal war leader, George III managed to give Parliament a sense of purpose to fight, and Lord North was able to keep his cabinet together. Lord North's cabinet ministers, the Earl of Sandwich, First Lord of the Admiralty, and Lord George Germain, Secretary of State for the Colonies, however, proved to lack leadership skills suited for their positions, which in turn, aided the American revolutionaries.

George III is often accused of obstinately trying to keep Great Britain at war with the revolutionaries in America, despite the opinions of his own ministers. In the words of the British historian George Otto Trevelyan, the King was determined "never to acknowledge the independence of the Americans, and to punish their contumacy by the indefinite prolongation of a war which promised to be eternal." The king wanted to "keep the rebels harassed, anxious, and poor, until the day when, by a natural and inevitable process, discontent and disappointment were converted into penitence and remorse". Later historians defend George by saying in the context of the times no king would willingly surrender such a large territory, and his conduct was far less ruthless than contemporary monarchs in Europe. After the surrender of a British army at Saratoga, both Parliament and the British people were largely in favor of the war; recruitment ran at high levels and although political opponents were vocal, they remained a small minority.

With the setbacks in America, Lord North asked to transfer power to Lord Chatham, whom he thought more capable, but George refused to do so; he suggested instead that Chatham serve as a subordinate minister in North's administration, but Chatham refused. He died later in the same year. Lord North was allied to the "King's Friends" in Parliament and believed George III had the right to exercise powers. In early 1778, Britain's chief rival France signed a treaty of alliance with the United States, and the confrontation soon escalated from a "rebellion" to something that has been characterized as "world war". The French fleet was able to outrun the British naval blockade of the Mediterranean and sailed to North America. The conflict now affected North America, Europe and India. The United States and France were joined by Spain in 1779 and the Dutch Republic, while Britain had no major allies of its own, except for the Loyalist minority in America and German auxiliaries (i.e. Hessians). Lord Gower and Lord Weymouth both resigned from the government. Lord North again requested that he also be allowed to resign, but he stayed in office at George III's insistence. Opposition to the costly war was increasing, and in June 1780 contributed to disturbances in London known as the Gordon riots.

As late as the Siege of Charleston in 1780, Loyalists could still believe in their eventual victory, as British troops inflicted defeats on the Continental forces at the Battle of Camden and the Battle of Guilford Court House. In late 1781, the news of Cornwallis's surrender at the siege of Yorktown reached London; Lord North's parliamentary support ebbed away and he resigned the following year. The King drafted an abdication notice, which was never delivered, finally accepted the defeat in North America, and authorized peace negotiations. The Treaties of Paris, by which Britain recognized the independence of the United States and returned Florida to Spain, were signed in 1782 and 1783 respectively. In early 1783, George III privately conceded "America is lost!" He reflected that the Northern colonies had developed into Britain's "successful rivals" in commercial trade and fishing.

When John Adams was appointed American Minister to London in 1785, George had become resigned to the new relationship between his country and the former colonies. He told Adams, "I was the last to consent to the separation; but the separation having been made and having become inevitable, I have always said, as I say now, that I would be the first to meet the friendship of the United States as an independent power."

Patriots

Those who fought for independence were called "Revolutionaries" "Continentals", "Rebels", "Patriots", "Whigs", "Congress-men", or "Americans" during and after the war. They included a full range of social and economic classes but were unanimous regarding the need to defend the rights of Americans and uphold the principles of republicanism in rejecting monarchy and aristocracy, while emphasizing civic virtue by citizens. The signers of the Declaration of Independence were mostly—with definite exceptions—well-educated, of British stock, and of the Protestant faith. Newspapers were strongholds of patriotism (although there were a few Loyalist papers) and printed many pamphlets, announcements, patriotic letters, and pronouncements.

According to historian Robert Calhoon, 40 to 45 percent of the white population in the Thirteen Colonies supported the Patriots' cause, 15 to 20 percent supported the Loyalists, and the remainder were neutral or kept a low profile. Mark Lender analyzes why ordinary people became insurgents against the British, even if they were unfamiliar with the ideological reasons behind the war. He concludes that such people held a sense of rights which the British were violating, rights that stressed local autonomy, fair dealing, and government by consent. They were highly sensitive to the issue of tyranny, which they saw manifested in the British response to the Boston Tea Party. The arrival in Boston of the British Army heightened their sense of violated rights, leading to rage and demands for revenge. They had faith that God was on their side.

Thomas Paine published his pamphlet Common Sense in January 1776, after the Revolution had started. It was widely distributed and often read aloud in taverns, contributing significantly to concurrently spreading the ideas of republicanism and liberalism, bolstering enthusiasm for separation from Great Britain and encouraging recruitment for the Continental Army. Paine presented the Revolution as the solution for Americans alarmed by the threat of tyranny.

Loyalists

The consensus of scholars is that about 15 to 20 percent of the white population remained loyal to the British Crown. Those who actively supported the king were known at the time as "Loyalists", "Tories", or "King's men". The Loyalists never controlled territory unless the British Army occupied it. They were typically older, less willing to break with old loyalties, and often connected to the Church of England; they included many established merchants with strong business connections throughout the Empire, as well as royal officials such as Thomas Hutchinson of Boston.

There were 500 to 1,000 Black Loyalists, enslaved African Americans who escaped to British lines and supported Britain's cause via several means. Many of them died from various diseases, but the survivors were evacuated by the British to their remaining colonies in North America.

The revolution could divide families, such as William Franklin, son of Benjamin Franklin and royal governor of the Province of New Jersey who remained loyal to the Crown throughout the war. He and his father never spoke again. Recent immigrants who had not been fully Americanized were also inclined to support the King, such as Flora MacDonald, a Scottish settler in the backcountry.

After the war, the great majority of the half-million Loyalists remained in America and resumed normal lives. Some became prominent American leaders, such as Samuel Seabury. Approximately 46,000 Loyalists relocated to Canada; others moved to Britain (7,000), Florida, or the West Indies (9,000). The exiles represented approximately two percent of the total population of the colonies. Nearly all black loyalists left for Nova Scotia, Florida, or England, where they could remain free. Loyalists who left the South in 1783 took thousands of their slaves with them as they fled to the British West Indies.

Neutrals

A minority of uncertain size tried to stay neutral in the war. Most kept a low profile, but the Quakers were the most important group to speak out for neutrality, especially in Pennsylvania. The Quakers continued to do business with the British even after the war began, and they were accused of supporting British rule, "contrivers and authors of seditious publications" critical of the revolutionary cause. Most Quakers remained neutral, although a sizeable number nevertheless participated to some degree.

Role of women

Women contributed to the American Revolution in many ways and were involved on both sides. Formal politics did not include women, but ordinary domestic behaviors became charged with political significance as Patriot women confronted a war which permeated all aspects of political, civil, and domestic life. They participated by boycotting British goods, spying on the British, following armies as they marched, washing, cooking, and mending for soldiers, delivering secret messages, and even fighting disguised as men in a few cases, such as Deborah Samson. Mercy Otis Warren held meetings in her house and cleverly attacked Loyalists with her creative plays and histories. Many women also acted as nurses and helpers, tending to the soldiers' wounds and buying and selling goods for them. Some of these camp followers even participated in combat, such as Madam John Turchin who led her husband's regiment into battle. Above all, women continued the agricultural work at home to feed their families and the armies. They maintained their families during their husbands' absences and sometimes after their deaths.

American women were integral to the success of the boycott of British goods, as the boycotted items were largely household articles such as tea and cloth. Women had to return to knitting goods and to spinning and weaving their own cloth—skills that had fallen into disuse. In 1769, the women of Boston produced 40,000 skeins of yarn, and 180 women in Middletown, Massachusetts wove  of cloth. Many women gathered food, money, clothes, and other supplies during the war to help the soldiers. A woman's loyalty to her husband could become an open political act, especially for women in America committed to men who remained loyal to the King. Legal divorce, usually rare, was granted to Patriot women whose husbands supported the King.

Other participants

France and Spain

In early 1776, France set up a major program of aid to the Americans, and the Spanish secretly added funds. Each country spent one million "livres tournaises" to buy munitions. A dummy corporation run by Pierre Beaumarchais concealed their activities. American Patriots obtained some munitions from the Dutch Republic as well, through the French and Spanish ports in the West Indies. Heavy expenditures and a weak taxation system pushed France toward bankruptcy.

In 1777, Charles François Adrien le Paulmier, Chevalier d'Annemours, acting as a secret agent for France, made sure General George Washington was privy to his mission. He followed Congress around for the next two years, reporting what he observed back to France. The Treaty of Alliance between the French and the Americans followed in 1778, which led to more French money, matériel and troops being sent to the United States.

Spain did not officially recognize the United States, but it was a French ally and it separately declared war on Britain on June 21, 1779. Bernardo de Gálvez, general of the Spanish forces in New Spain, also served as governor of Louisiana. He led an expedition of colonial troops to capture Florida from the British and to keep open a vital conduit for supplies.

Germans

Ethnic Germans served on both sides of the American Revolutionary War. As George III was also the Elector of Hanover, many supported the Loyalist cause and served as allies of the Kingdom of Great Britain; most notably rented auxiliary troops from German states such as the Landgraviate of Hessen-Kassel.

American Patriots tended to represent such troops as mercenaries in propaganda against the British Crown. Even American historians followed suit, in spite of Colonial-era jurists drawing a distinction between auxiliaries and mercenaries, with auxiliaries serving their prince when sent to the aid of another prince, and mercenaries serving a foreign prince as individuals. By this distinction the troops which served in the American Revolution were auxiliaries.

Other German individuals came to assist the American revolutionaries, most notably Friedrich Wilhelm von Steuben, who served as a general in the Continental Army and is credited with professionalizing that force, but most Germans who served were already colonists. Von Steuben's native Prussia joined the League of Armed Neutrality, and King Frederick II of Prussia was well appreciated in the United States for his support early in the war. He expressed interest in opening trade with the United States and bypassing English ports, and allowed an American agent to buy arms in Prussia. Frederick predicted American success, and promised to recognize the United States and American diplomats once France did the same. Prussia also interfered in the recruiting efforts of Russia and neighboring German states when they raised armies to send to the Americas, and Frederick II forbade enlistment for the American war within Prussia. All Prussian roads were denied to troops from Anhalt-Zerbst, which delayed reinforcements that Howe had hoped to receive during the winter of 1777–1778.

However, when the War of the Bavarian Succession erupted, Frederick II became much more cautious with Prussian/British relations. U.S. ships were denied access to Prussian ports, and Frederick refused to officially recognize the United States until they had signed the Treaty of Paris. Even after the war, Frederick II predicted that the United States was too large to operate as a republic, and that it would soon rejoin the British Empire with representatives in Parliament.

Native Americans

Most indigenous people rejected pleas that they remain neutral and instead supported the British Crown. The great majority of the 200,000 indigenous people east of the Mississippi distrusted the colonists and supported the British cause, hoping to forestall continued expansion of settlement into their territories. Those tribes closely involved in trade tended to side with the Patriots, although political factors were important as well. Some indigenous people tried to remain neutral, seeing little value in joining what they perceived to be a "white man's war", and fearing reprisals from whichever side they opposed.

The great majority of indigenous people did not participate directly in the war, with the notable exceptions of warriors and bands associated with four of the Iroquois tribes in New York and Pennsylvania which allied with the British, and the Oneida and Tuscarora tribes among the Iroquois of central and western New York who supported the American cause. The British did have other allies, particularly in the regions of southwest Quebec on the Patriot's frontier. The British provided arms to indigenous people who were led by Loyalists in war parties to raid frontier settlements from the Carolinas to New York. These war parties managed to kill many settlers on the frontier, especially in Pennsylvania and New York's Mohawk Valley.

In 1776, Cherokee war parties attacked American Colonists all along the southern Quebec frontier of the uplands throughout the Washington District, North Carolina (now Tennessee) and the Kentucky wilderness area. The Chickamauga Cherokee under Dragging Canoe allied themselves closely with the British, and fought on for an additional decade after the Treaty of Paris was signed. They would launch raids with roughly 200 warriors, as seen in the Cherokee–American wars; they could not mobilize enough forces to invade settler areas without the help of allies, most often the Creek.

Joseph Brant (also Thayendanegea) of the powerful Mohawk tribe in New York was the most prominent indigenous leader against the Patriot forces. In 1778 and 1780, he led 300 Iroquois warriors and 100 white Loyalists in multiple attacks on small frontier settlements in New York and Pennsylvania, killing many settlers and destroying villages, crops, and stores.

In 1779, the Continental Army forced the hostile indigenous people out of upstate New York when Washington sent an army under John Sullivan which destroyed 40 evacuated Iroquois villages in central and western New York. Sullivan systematically burned the empty villages and destroyed about 160,000 bushels of corn that composed the winter food supply. The Battle of Newtown proved decisive, as the Patriots had an advantage of three-to-one, and it ended significant resistance; there was little combat otherwise.  Facing starvation and homeless for the winter, the Iroquois fled to Canada. The British resettled them in Ontario, providing land grants as compensation for some of their losses.

At the peace conference following the war, the British ceded lands which they did not really control, and which they did not consult about with their indigenous allies during the treaty negotiations. They transferred control to the United States of all the land south of the Great Lakes east of the Mississippi and north of Florida. Calloway concludes:

The British did not give up their forts until 1796 in the Ohio country and Illinois country; they kept alive the dream of forming an allied indigenous nation there, which they referred to an "Indian barrier state". That goal was one of the causes of the War of 1812.

Black Americans

Free blacks in the New England Colonies and Middle Colonies in the North as well as Southern Colonies fought on both sides of the War, but the majority fought for the Patriots. Gary Nash reports that there were about 9,000 black veteran Patriots, counting the Continental Army and Navy, state militia units, privateers, wagoneers in the Army, servants to officers, and spies. Ray Raphael notes that thousands did join the Loyalist cause, but "a far larger number, free as well as slave, tried to further their interests by siding with the patriots." Crispus Attucks was one of the five people killed in the Boston Massacre in 1770 and is considered the first American casualty for the cause of independence.

The effects of the war were more dramatic in the South. Tens of thousands of slaves escaped to British lines throughout the South, causing dramatic losses to slaveholders and disrupting cultivation and harvesting of crops. For instance, South Carolina was estimated to have lost about 25,000 slaves to flight, migration, or death which amounted to a third of its slave population. From 1770 to 1790, the black proportion of the population (mostly slaves) in South Carolina dropped from 60.5 percent to 43.8 percent, and from 45.2 percent to 36.1 percent in Georgia.

During the war, the British commanders attempted to weaken the Patriots by issuing proclamations of freedom to their slaves. In the November 1775 document known as Dunmore's Proclamation Virginia royal governor, Lord Dunmore recruited black men into the British forces with the promise of freedom, protection for their families, and land grants. Some men responded and briefly formed the British Ethiopian Regiment. Historian David Brion Davis explains the difficulties with a policy of wholesale arming of the slaves:

Davis underscores the British dilemma: "Britain, when confronted by the rebellious American colonists, hoped to exploit their fear of slave revolts while also reassuring the large number of slave-holding Loyalists and wealthy Caribbean planters and merchants that their slave property would be secure". The Americans, however, accused the British of encouraging slave revolts, with the issue becoming one of the 27 colonial grievances.

The existence of slavery in the American colonies had attracted criticism from both sides of the Atlantic as many could not reconcile the existence of the institution with the egalitarian ideals espoused by leaders of the Revolution. British writer Samuel Johnson wrote "how is it we hear the loudest yelps for liberty among the drivers of the Negroes?" in a text opposing the grievances of the colonists. Referring to this contradiction, English abolitionist Thomas Day wrote in a 1776 letter that  African American writer Lemuel Haynes expressed similar viewpoints in his essay Liberty Further Extended where he wrote that "Liberty is Equally as pre[c]ious to a Black man, as it is to a white one". Thomas Jefferson unsuccessfully attempted to include a section in the Declaration of Independence which asserted that King George III had "forced" the slave trade onto the colonies. Despite the turmoil of the period, African-Americans contributed to the foundation of an American national identity during the Revolution. Phyllis Wheatley, an African-American poet, popularized the image of Columbia to represent America. She came to public attention when her Poems on Various Subjects, Religious and Moral appeared in 1773, and received praise from George Washington.

The 1779 Philipsburg Proclamation expanded the promise of freedom for black men who enlisted in the British military to all the colonies in rebellion. British forces gave transportation to 10,000 slaves when they evacuated Savannah and Charleston, carrying through on their promise. They evacuated and resettled more than 3,000 Black Loyalists from New York to Nova Scotia, Upper Canada, and Lower Canada. Others sailed with the British to England or were resettled as freedmen in the West Indies of the Caribbean. But slaves carried to the Caribbean under control of Loyalist masters generally remained slaves until British abolition of slavery in its colonies in 1833–1838. More than 1,200 of the Black Loyalists of Nova Scotia later resettled in the British colony of Sierra Leone, where they became leaders of the Krio ethnic group of Freetown and the later national government. Many of their descendants still live in Sierra Leone, as well as other African countries.

Effects of the Revolution

After the Revolution, genuinely democratic politics became possible in the former American colonies. The rights of the people were incorporated into state constitutions. Concepts of liberty, individual rights, equality among men and hostility toward corruption became incorporated as core values of liberal republicanism. The greatest challenge to the old order in Europe was the challenge to inherited political power and the democratic idea that government rests on the consent of the governed. The example of the first successful revolution against a European empire, and the first successful establishment of a republican form of democratically elected government, provided a model for many other colonial peoples who realized that they too could break away and become self-governing nations with directly elected representative government.

Interpretations
Interpretations vary concerning the effect of the Revolution. Historians such as Bernard Bailyn, Gordon Wood, and Edmund Morgan view it as a unique and radical event which produced deep changes and had a profound effect on world affairs, such as an increasing belief in the principles of the Enlightenment. These were demonstrated by a leadership and government that espoused protection of natural rights, and a system of laws chosen by the people. John Murrin, by contrast, argues that the definition of "the people" at that time was mostly restricted to free men who passed a property qualification. This view argues that any significant gain of the revolution was irrelevant in the short term to women, black Americans and slaves, poor white men, youth, and Native Americans.

Gordon Wood states:
The American Revolution was integral to the changes occurring in American society, politics and culture .... These changes were radical, and they were extensive .... The Revolution not only radically changed the personal and social relationships of people, including the position of women, but also destroyed aristocracy as it'd been understood in the Western world for at least two millennia.

Edmund Morgan has argued that, in terms of long-term impact on American society and values:
The Revolution did revolutionize social relations. It did displace the deference, the patronage, the social divisions that had determined the way people viewed one another for centuries and still view one another in much of the world. It did give to ordinary people a pride and power, not to say an arrogance, that have continued to shock visitors from less favored lands. It may have left standing a host of inequalities that have troubled us ever since. But it generated the egalitarian view of human society that makes them troubling and makes our world so different from the one in which the revolutionists had grown up.

Inspiring other independence movements and revolutions

The first shot of the American Revolution at the Battle of Lexington and Concord is referred to as the "shot heard 'round the world" due to its historical and global significance. The Revolutionary War victory not only established the United States as the first modern constitutional republic, but marked the transition from an age of monarchy to a new age of freedom by inspiring similar movements worldwide. The American Revolution was the first of the "Atlantic Revolutions": followed most notably by the French Revolution, the Haitian Revolution, and the Latin American wars of independence. Aftershocks contributed to rebellions in Ireland, the Polish–Lithuanian Commonwealth, and the Netherlands.

The U.S. Constitution, drafted shortly after independence, remains the world's oldest written constitution, and has been emulated by other countries, in some cases verbatim. Some historians and scholars argue that the subsequent wave of independence and revolutionary movements has contributed to the continued expansion of democratic government; 144 countries, representing two-third of the world's population, are full or partially democracies of same form.

The Dutch Republic, also at war with Britain, was the next country after France to sign a treaty with the United States, on October 8, 1782. On April 3, 1783, Ambassador Extraordinary Gustaf Philip Creutz, representing King Gustav III of Sweden, and Benjamin Franklin, signed a Treaty of Amity and Commerce with the U.S.

The Revolution had a strong, immediate influence in Great Britain, Ireland, the Netherlands, and France. Many British and Irish Whigs in Parliament spoke glowingly in favor of the American cause. In Ireland, the Protestant minority who controlled Ireland demanded self-rule. Under the leadership of Henry Grattan, the Irish Patriot Party forced the reversal of mercantilist prohibitions against trade with other British colonies. The King and his cabinet in London could not risk another rebellion on the American model, and so made a series of concessions to the Patriot faction in Dublin. Armed volunteer units of the Protestant Ascendancy were set up ostensibly to protect against an invasion from France. As had been in colonial America, so too in Ireland now the King no longer had a monopoly of lethal force.

For many Europeans, such as the Marquis de Lafayette, who later were active during the era of the French Revolution, the American case along with the Dutch Revolt (end of the 16th century) and the 17th century English Civil War, was among the examples of overthrowing an old regime. The American Declaration of Independence influenced the French Declaration of the Rights of Man and of the Citizen of 1789. The spirit of the Declaration of Independence led to laws ending slavery in all the Northern states and the Northwest Territory, with New Jersey the last in 1804. States such as New Jersey and New York adopted gradual emancipation, which kept some people as slaves for more than two decades longer.

Status of African Americans

During the revolution, the contradiction between the Patriots' professed ideals of liberty and the institution of slavery generated increased scrutiny of the latter. As early as 1764, the Boston Patriot leader James Otis, Jr. declared that all men, "white or black", were "by the law of nature" born free. Anti-slavery calls became more common in the early 1770s. In 1773, Benjamin Rush, the future signer of the Declaration of Independence, called on "advocates for American liberty" to oppose slavery, writing, "The plant of liberty is of so tender a nature that it cannot thrive long in the neighborhood of slavery.". The contradiction between calls for liberty and the continued existence of slavery also opened up the Patriots to charges of hypocrisy. In 1775, the English Tory writer Samuel Johnson asked, "How is it that we hear the loudest yelps for liberty among the drivers of negroes?"

In the late 1760s and early 1770s, a number of colonies, including Massachusetts and Virginia, attempted to restrict the slave trade, but were prevented from doing so by royally appointed governors. In 1774, as part of a broader non-importation movement aimed at Britain, the Continental Congress called on all the colonies to ban the importation of slaves, and the colonies passed acts doing so. In 1775, the Quakers founded first antislavery society in the Western world, the Pennsylvania Abolition Society.

In the first two decades after the American Revolution, state legislatures and individuals took actions to free slaves, in part based on revolutionary ideals. Northern states passed new constitutions that contained language about equal rights or specifically abolished slavery; some states, such as New York and New Jersey, where slavery was more widespread, passed laws by the end of the 18th century to abolish slavery by a gradual method. By 1804, all the northern states had passed laws outlawing slavery, either immediately or over time. In New York, the last slaves were freed in 1827. Indentured servitude (temporary slavery), which had been widespread in the colonies (half the population of Philadelphia had once been bonded servants) dropped dramatically, and disappeared by 1800.

No southern state abolished slavery, but for a period individual owners could free their slaves by personal decision, often providing for manumission in wills but sometimes filing deeds or court papers to free individuals. Numerous slaveholders who freed their slaves cited revolutionary ideals in their documents; others freed slaves as a reward for service. Records also suggest that some slaveholders were freeing their own mixed-race children, born into slavery to slave mothers. The number of free blacks as a proportion of the black population in the upper South increased from less than 1 percent to nearly 10 percent between 1790 and 1810 as a result of these actions. Nevertheless, slavery continued in the South, where it became a "peculiar institution", setting the stage for future sectional conflict between North and South over the issue.

Thousands of free Blacks in the northern states fought in the state militias and Continental Army. In the south, both sides offered freedom to slaves who would perform military service. Roughly 20,000 slaves fought in the American Revolution.

Status of American women

The democratic ideals of the Revolution inspired changes in the roles of women.

The concept of republican motherhood was inspired by this period and reflects the importance of revolutionary republicanism as the dominant American ideology. It assumed that a successful republic rested upon the virtue of its citizens. Women were considered to have the essential role of instilling their children with values conducive to a healthy republic. During this period, the wife's relationship with her husband also became more liberal, as love and affection instead of obedience and subservience began to characterize the ideal marital relationship. In addition, many women contributed to the war effort through fundraising and running family businesses without their husbands.

The traditional constraints gave way to more liberal conditions for women. Young people had more freedom to choose their spouses and more often used birth control to regulate the size of their families. Society emphasized the role of mothers in child rearing, especially the patriotic goal of raising republican children rather than those locked into aristocratic value systems. There was more permissiveness in child-rearing. Patriot women married to Loyalists who left the state could get a divorce and obtain control of the ex-husband's property.

Whatever gains they had made, however, women still found themselves subordinated, legally and socially, to their husbands, disfranchised and usually with only the role of mother open to them. But, some women earned livelihoods as midwives and in other roles in the community not originally recognized as significant by men.

Abigail Adams expressed to her husband, the president, the desire of women to have a place in the new republic: 

The Revolution sparked a discussion on the rights of woman and an environment favorable to women's participation in politics. Briefly the possibilities for women's rights were highly favorable, but a backlash led to a greater rigidity that excluded women from politics.

For more than thirty years, however, the 1776 New Jersey State Constitution gave the vote to "all inhabitants" who had a certain level of wealth, including unmarried women and blacks (not married women because they could not own property separately from their husbands), until in 1807, when that state legislature passed a bill interpreting the constitution to mean universal white male suffrage, excluding paupers.

Loyalist expatriation

Tens of thousands of Loyalists left the United States following the war, and Maya Jasanoff estimates as many as 70,000. Some migrated to Britain, but the great majority received land and subsidies for resettlement in British colonies in North America, especially Quebec (concentrating in the Eastern Townships), Prince Edward Island, and Nova Scotia. Britain created the colonies of Upper Canada (Ontario) and New Brunswick expressly for their benefit, and the Crown awarded land to Loyalists as compensation for losses in the United States. Nevertheless, approximately eighty-five percent of the Loyalists stayed in the United States as American citizens, and some of the exiles later returned to the U.S. Patrick Henry spoke of the issue of allowing Loyalists to return as such: "Shall we, who have laid the proud British lion at our feet, be frightened of its whelps?" His actions helped secure return of the Loyalists to American soil.

Commemorations

The American Revolution has a central place in the American memory as the story of the nation's founding. It is covered in the schools, memorialized by a national holiday, and commemorated in innumerable monuments. George Washington's estate at Mount Vernon was one of the first national pilgrimages for tourists and attracted 10,000 visitors a year by the 1850s.

The Revolution became a matter of contention in the 1850s in the debates leading to the American Civil War (1861–1865), as spokesmen of both the Northern United States and the Southern United States claimed that their region was the true custodian of the legacy of 1776. The United States Bicentennial in 1976 came a year after the American withdrawal from the Vietnam War, and speakers stressed the themes of renewal and rebirth based on a restoration of traditional values.

Today, more than 100 battlefields and historic sites of the American Revolution are protected and maintained by the government. The National Park Service alone owns and maintains more than 50 battlefield parks and many other sites such as Independence Hall that are related to the Revolution, as well as the residences, workplaces and meeting places of many Founders and other important figures. The private American Battlefield Trust uses government grants and other funds to preserve almost 700 acres of battlefield land in six states, and the ambitious private recreation/restoration/preservation/interpretation of over 300 acres of pre-1790 Colonial Williamsburg was created in the first half of the 20th century for public visitation.

See also 
 Bourgeois revolution
 Founding Fathers of the United States
 List of George Washington articles
 List of plays and films about the American Revolution
 List of television series and miniseries about the American Revolution
 Museum of the American Revolution
 Timeline of the American Revolution

Notes

References

General sources

Bibliography

Reference works
 Barnes, Ian, and Charles Royster. The Historical Atlas of the American Revolution (2000), maps and commentary excerpt and text search
 
 
 Cappon, Lester J. Atlas of Early American History: The Revolutionary Era, 1760–1790 (1976)
 Fremont-Barnes, Gregory, and Richard A. Ryerson, eds. The Encyclopedia of the American Revolutionary War: A Political, Social, and Military History (5 vol. 2006) 1000 entries by 150 experts, covering all topics
 Gray, Edward G., and Jane Kamensky, eds. The Oxford Handbook of the American Revolution (2013) 672 pp; 33 essays by scholars
 Greene, Jack P. and J. R. Pole, eds. A Companion to the American Revolution (2004), 777 pp – an expanded edition of Greene and Pole, eds. The Blackwell Encyclopedia of the American Revolution (1994); comprehensive coverage of political and social themes and international dimension; thin on military
 Herrera, Ricardo A. "American War of Independence" Oxford Bibliographies (2017) annotated guide to major scholarly books and articles online
 Kennedy, Frances H. The American Revolution: A Historical Guidebook (2014) A guide to 150 famous historical sites.
 
 Purcell, L. Edward. Who Was Who in the American Revolution (1993); 1500 short biographies
 Resch, John P., ed. Americans at War: Society, Culture and the Homefront vol 1 (2005), articles by scholars
 Selesky, Harold E. ed., Encyclopedia of the American Revolution (3 vol. Gale, 2006)
 Symonds, Craig L. and William J. Clipson. A Battlefield Atlas of the American Revolution (1986) new diagrams of each battle

Surveys of the era
 Alden, John R. A history of the American Revolution (1966) 644 pp online free to borrow, A scholarly general survey
 Allison, Robert. The American Revolution: A Concise History (2011) 128 pp excerpt and text search
 Atkinson, Rick. The British Are Coming: The War for America, Lexington to Princeton, 1775–1777 (2019) (vol 1 of his 'The Revolution Trilogy'); called, "one of the best books written on the American War for Independence," [Journal of Military History Jan 2020 p. 268]; the maps are online here
 Axelrod, Alan. The Real History of the American Revolution: A New Look at the Past (2009), well-illustrated popular history
 Bancroft, George. History of the United States of America, from the discovery of the American continent. (1854–78), vol 4–10 online edition, classic 19th century narrative; highly detailed
 Black, Jeremy. War for America: The Fight for Independence 1775–1783 (2001) 266 pp; by leading British scholar
 Brown, Richard D., and Thomas Paterson, eds. Major Problems in the Era of the American Revolution, 1760–1791: Documents and Essays (2nd ed. 1999)
 Christie, Ian R. and Benjamin W. Labaree. Empire or Independence: 1760–1776 (1976)
 Cogliano, Francis D. Revolutionary America, 1763–1815; A Political History (2nd ed. 2008), British textbook
 Ellis, Joseph J. American Creation: Triumphs and Tragedies in the Founding of the Republic (2008) excerpt and text search
 Higginbotham, Don. The War of American Independence: Military Attitudes, Policies, and Practice, 1763–1789 (1983) Online in ACLS Humanities E-book Project; comprehensive coverage of military and domestic aspects of the war.
 Jensen, Merrill. The Founding of a Nation: A History of the American Revolution 1763–1776. (2004)
 Knollenberg, Bernhard. Growth of the American Revolution: 1766–1775 (2003) 
 Lecky, William Edward Hartpole. The American Revolution, 1763–1783 (1898), older British perspective online edition
 Mackesy, Piers. The War for America: 1775–1783 (1992), British military study online edition
 Middlekauff, Robert. The Glorious Cause: The American Revolution, 1763–1789 (Oxford History of the United States, 2005). online edition
 Miller, John C. Triumph of Freedom, 1775–1783 (1948) online edition
 Miller, John C. Origins of the American Revolution (1943) online edition, to 1775
 Rakove, Jack N. Revolutionaries: A New History of the Invention of America (2010) interpretation by leading scholar excerpt and text search
 Taylor, Alan. American Revolutions: A Continental History, 1750–1804 (2016) 704 pp; recent survey by leading scholar
 Weintraub, Stanley. Iron Tears: Rebellion in America 1775–83 (2005) excerpt and text search, popular
 Wood, Gordon S. Revolutionary Characters: What Made the Founders Different (2007)
 Wrong, George M. Washington and His Comrades in Arms: A Chronicle of the War of Independence (1921) online short survey by Canadian scholar online

Specialized studies
 Baer, Friederike. Hessians: German Soldiers in the American Revolutionary War (Oxford University Press, 2022). Publisher's website.
 Bailyn, Bernard. The Ideological Origins of the American Revolution. (Harvard University Press, 1967). 
 
 Becker, Carl. The Declaration of Independence: A Study on the History of Political Ideas (1922)
 Becker, Frank: The American Revolution as a European Media Event, European History Online, Mainz: Institute of European History, 2011, retrieved: October 25, 2011.
 Breen, T. H. The Marketplace of Revolution: How Consumer Politics Shaped American Independence (2005)
 Breen, T. H. American Insurgents, American Patriots: The Revolution of the People (2010) 337 pages; examines rebellions in 1774–76 including loosely organized militants took control before elected safety committees emerged.
 Brunsman, Denver, and David J Silverman, eds. The American Revolution Reader (Routledge Readers in History, 2013) 472 pp; essays by leading scholars 
 Chernow, Ron. Washington: A Life (2010) detailed biography; Pulitzer Prize 
 Crow, Jeffrey J. and Larry E. Tise, eds. The Southern Experience in the American Revolution (1978) 
 Fischer, David Hackett. Paul Revere's Ride (1995), Minutemen in 1775 
 Fischer, David Hackett. Washington's Crossing (2004). 1776 campaigns; Pulitzer prize. 
 Freeman, Douglas Southall. Washington (1968) Pulitzer Prize; abridged version of 7 vol biography 
 Horne, Gerald. The Counter-Revolution of 1776: Slave Resistance and the Origins of the United States of America. (New York University Press, 2014). 
 Kerber, Linda K. Women of the Republic: Intellect and Ideology in Revolutionary America (1979) 
 Kidd, Thomas S. God of Liberty: A Religious History of the American Revolution (2010) 
 Langley, Lester D. The Long American Revolution and Its Legacy(U of Georgia Press, 2019) online review emphasis on long-term global impact.
 Lockwood, Matthew. To Begin the World Over Again: How the American Revolution Devastated the Globe. (Yale University Press; 2019) 
 McCullough, David. 1776 (2005). ; popular narrative of the year 1776
 Maier, Pauline. American Scripture: Making the Declaration of Independence (1998) excerpt and text search
 Nash, Gary B. The Unknown American Revolution: The Unruly Birth of Democracy and the Struggle to Create America. (2005). 
 Nevins, Allan; The American States during and after the Revolution, 1775–1789 1927. online edition
 Norton, Mary Beth. Liberty's Daughters: The Revolutionary Experience of American Women, 1750–1800 (1980) 
 Norton, Mary Beth. 1774: The Long Year of Revolution (2020) online review by Gordon S. Wood
 O'Shaughnessy Andrew Jackson. The Men Who Lost America: British Leadership, the American Revolution, and the Fate of the Empire (Yale University Press; 2013) 466 pages; on top British leaders 
 Palmer, Robert R. The Age of the Democratic Revolution: A Political History of Europe and America, 1760–1800. vol 1 (1959) online edition
 Resch, John Phillips and Walter Sargent, eds. War and Society in the American Revolution: Mobilization and Home Fronts (2006) 
 
 
 Rothbard, Murray, Conceived in Liberty (2011), Volume III: Advance to Revolution, 1760–1775 and Volume IV: The Revolutionary War, 1775–1784. ,  libertarian perspective
 Van Tyne, Claude Halstead. American Loyalists: The Loyalists in the American Revolution (1902) online edition
 Volo, James M. and Dorothy Denneen Volo. Daily Life during the American Revolution (2003)
 Wahlke, John C. ed. The Causes of the American Revolution (1967) primary and secondary readings online
 Wood, Gordon S. American Revolution (2005) [excerpt and text search] 208 pp excerpt and text search
 Wood, Gordon S. The Radicalism of the American Revolution: How a Revolution Transformed a Monarchical Society into a Democratic One Unlike Any That Had Ever Existed. (1992), by a leading scholar

Historiography
 Allison, David, and Larrie D. Ferreiro, eds. The American Revolution: A World War (Smithsonian, 2018) excerpt 
 Breen, Timothy H. "Ideology and nationalism on the eve of the American Revolution: Revisions once more in need of revising." Journal of American History (1997): 13–39. in JSTOR
 Countrymen, Edward. "Historiography" in Harold E. Selesky, ed., Encyclopedia of the American Revolution (Gale, 2006) pp. 501–508. 
 Gibson, Alan. Interpreting the Founding: Guide to the Enduring Debates over the Origins and Foundations of the American Republic (2006).
 Hattem, Michael D. "The Historiography of the American Revolution" Journal of the American Revolution (2013) online outlines ten different scholarly approaches
 Morgan, Gwenda. The Debate on the American Revolution (2007). Manchester University Press. 
 Schocket, Andrew M. Fighting over the Founders: How We Remember the American Revolution (2014).  . How politicians, screenwriters, activists, biographers, museum professionals, and re-enactors portray the American Revolution.  excerpt
 Sehat, David. The Jefferson Rule: How the Founding Fathers Became Infallible and Our Politics Inflexible (2015).   excerpt
 Shalhope, Robert E. "Toward a republican synthesis: the emergence of an understanding of republicanism in American historiography." William and Mary Quarterly (1972): 49–80. in JSTOR
 Waldstreicher, David. "The Revolutions of Revolution Historiography: Cold War Contradance, Neo-Imperial Waltz, or Jazz Standard?" Reviews in American History 42.1 (2014): 23–35. online
 Wood, Gordon S.  "Rhetoric and Reality in the American Revolution." William and Mary Quarterly (1966): 4–32. in JSTOR
 Young, Alfred F. and Gregory H. Nobles. Whose American Revolution Was It? Historians Interpret the Founding (2011). NYU Press.

Primary sources
 The American Revolution: Writings from the War of Independence (2001), Library of America 
 
 Dann, John C., ed. The Revolution Remembered: Eyewitness Accounts of the War for Independence (1999). . excerpt and text search, recollections by ordinary soldiers
 
 Humphrey, Carol Sue, ed. The Revolutionary Era: Primary Documents on Events from 1776 to 1800 (2003), Greenwood Press. , Newspaper accounts excerpt and text search
 Jensen, Merill, ed. Tracts of the American Revolution, 1763–1776 (1967). American pamphlets 
 Jensen, Merill, ed. English Historical Documents: American Colonial Documents to 1776: Volume 9 (1955), 890pp; major collection of important documents 
 Morison, Samuel E. ed. Sources and Documents Illustrating the American Revolution, 1764–1788, and the Formation of the Federal Constitution (1923). . online version
 Tansill, Charles C. ed.; Documents Illustrative of the Formation of the Union of the American States. (1927). Government Printing Office.  . online version
 Martin Kallich and Andrew MacLeish, eds. The American Revolution through British eyes (1962) primary documents

Contemporaneous sources: Annual Register
 Murdoch, David H. ed. Rebellion in America: A Contemporary British Viewpoint, 1769–1783 (1979), 900+ pp of annotated excerpts from Annual Register 

 Annual Register 1773, British compendium of speeches and reports
 Annual Register 1774
 Annual Register 1775
 Annual Register 1776
 Annual Register 1777
 Annual Register 1778
 Annual Register 1779
 Annual Register 1780
 Annual Register 1781
 Annual Register 1782
 Annual Register 1783

External links
 American Revolution, US National Park Service website portal
 American Independence (Teaching with Historic Places) Teaching with Historic Places (TwHP) uses historic places in National Parks and in the National Park Service's National Register of Historic Places to enliven history, social studies, geography, civics, and other subjects. TwHP has created a variety of products and activities that help teachers bring historic places into the classroom.
 Library of Congress Guide to the American Revolution
 "Hessians:" German Soldiers in the American Revolutionary War. Academic blog with original German sources, English translations, and commentary.
 Museum of the American Revolution
 Revolution! The Atlantic World Reborn, Revolution! explores the enormous transformations in the world's politics that took place from 1763 to 1815, with particular attention to three globally influential revolutions in America, France, and Haiti. Linking the attack on monarchism and aristocracy to the struggle against slavery, Revolution!shows how freedom, equality, and the sovereignty of the people became universal goals.New-York Historical Society
 132 historic photographs dealing with the personalities, monuments, weapons and locations of the American Revolution; these are pre-1923 and out of copyright.
 Pictures of the Revolutionary War: Select Audiovisual Records, National Archives and Records Administration selection of images, including a number of non-military events and portraits
 The Democratic Revolution of the Enlightenment. Legacy of the struggle for independence and democracy.
 PBS Television Series Liberty
 Chickasaws Conflicted by the American Revolution – Chickasaw.TV
 Smithsonian study unit on Revolutionary Money
 The American Revolution, the History Channel (US cable television) website
 Black Loyalist Heritage Society
 Spanish and Latin American contribution to the American Revolution
 American Archives: Documents of the American Revolution at Northern Illinois University Libraries
 "Counter-Revolution of 1776": Was U.S. Independence War a Conservative Revolt in Favor of Slavery? Democracy Now! June 27, 2014.

 
1770s conflicts
1780s conflicts
1770s in the United States
1780s in the United States
18th-century rebellions
18th-century revolutions
Legal history of the United States
Age of Enlightenment
1760s conflicts